Bolhrad (Gagauz: Bolgrad), is a small city in Odesa Oblast (province) of southwestern Ukraine, in the historical region of Budjak. It is the administrative center of Bolhrad Raion (district) and hosts the administration of Bolhrad urban hromada, one of the hromadas of Ukraine. Population:

History

Bolhrad was founded in 1821 by Bulgarian settlers in Bessarabia, under the direction of General Ivan Inzov who is "revered" by Bolhrad residents as the "Founder of Our City." Bolhrad became part of Moldavia from 1856 to 1859, Romania from 1859 to 1878, 1918 to 1940, and 1941 to 1944, before being incorporated into the USSR (in the territory of the Ukrainian SSR), and later independent Ukraine. In 1921, there was a terrorist attack on a palace on the city.

Demographics

The surrounding Bolhradsky district is predominantly populated by ethnic Bulgarians (a majority of 61%). Bolhrad itself is inhabited by a large number of Bessarabian Bulgarians and is considered by locals to be the unofficial capital of the Bessarabian historic district of Budjak.

Economy

As of 1920, Bolhrad has had a coal industry.

Education

The Georgi Sava Rakovski Bolhrad High School founded in 1858 is the oldest high school of the Bulgarian National Revival.

Notable residents
 Dimitar Grekov (1847–1901), Bulgarian politician
 Danail Nikolaev (1852–1942), Bulgarian general
 Georgi Todorov (1858–1934), Bulgarian general
 Mykola Shmatko (b. 1943), contemporary Ukrainian sculptor, professor and painter (not a native, but lived in Bolhrad)
 Petro Poroshenko (b. 1965), fifth President of Ukraine, entrepreneur, business oligarch

References

External links
 More about Bolhrad on the web-site of Bolhrad gymnasium

Cities in Odesa Oblast
Populated places established in 1821
Cities of district significance in Ukraine
Populated places established in the Russian Empire
1821 establishments in the Russian Empire
Bulgarian communities in Ukraine
Bessarabia Governorate
Ismail County
Bolhrad Raion